James Henry Dufft (June 25, 1896 – May 28, 1960) was an American football player. He played professionally in the National Football League (NFL) with the Rochester Jeffersons, New York Brickley Giants and the Milwaukee Badgers. Brickley's New York Giants are not related to the modern-day New York Giants.  Prior to joining the NFL, Dufft played college football at Fordham University and Rutgers University.

References

1896 births
1960 deaths
American football guards
American football tackles
Fordham Rams football players
Milwaukee Badgers players
New York Brickley Giants players
Rochester Jeffersons players
Rutgers Scarlet Knights football players
Sportspeople from Mount Vernon, New York
Players of American football from New York City